is a private university in Nishinomiya, Hyōgo, Japan, established in 1972 by Shigeki Morimura.

External links
 https://www-hyo--med-ac-jp.translate.goog/about/message/?_x_tr_sl=ja&_x_tr_tl=en&_x_tr_hl=en-US Official website] 

Educational institutions established in 1972
Private universities and colleges in Japan
Universities and colleges in Hyōgo Prefecture
Kansai Collegiate American Football League
Medical schools in Japan